Conpoy or dried scallop is a type of Cantonese dried seafood product that is made from the adductor muscle of scallops. The smell of conpoy is marine, pungent, and reminiscent of certain salt-cured meats. Its taste is rich in umami due to its high content of various free amino acids, such as glycine, alanine, and glutamic acid. It is also rich in nucleic acids such as inosinic acid, amino acid byproducts such as taurine, and minerals, such as calcium and zinc.

Conpoy is produced by cooking raw scallops and then drying them.

Terminology
Conpoy is a loanword from the Cantonese pronunciation of 乾貝, which literally means "dried shell(fish)".

Usage

In Hong Kong, conpoy from two types of scallops are common.

As with many dried foods, conpoy was originally made as a way to preserve seafood in times of excess. In more recent times its use in cuisine has been elevated to gourmet status. Conpoy has a strong and distinctive flavor that can be easily identified when used in rice congee, stir fries, stews, and sauces.

XO sauce, a seasoning used for frying vegetables or seafoods in Cantonese cuisine, contains significant quantities of conpoy.  For example, the Lee Kum Kee formulation lists conpoy as the third ingredient on its label.

See also

References

Seafood
Food ingredients
Dried meat